Kerstin Behrendt (born 2 September 1967 in Leisnig) is a former German athlete, who mainly competed in the 100 m during her career.

Behrendt competed for East Germany at the 1988 Summer Olympics held in Seoul, South Korea, where she won the silver medal in the women's 4 × 100 m relay with her team mates Silke Möller, Ingrid Auerswald and Marlies Göhr.

See also
 German all-time top lists – 200 metres

References

Sports Reference

1967 births
Living people
People from Leisnig
People from Bezirk Leipzig
East German female sprinters
Sportspeople from Saxony
Olympic athletes of East Germany
World Athletics Championships athletes for East Germany
Athletes (track and field) at the 1988 Summer Olympics
Olympic silver medalists for East Germany
Medalists at the 1988 Summer Olympics
World Athletics Championships medalists
European Athletics Championships medalists
Olympic silver medalists in athletics (track and field)
Recipients of the Patriotic Order of Merit in silver
Olympic female sprinters